The Fontanelle Township Hall is a historic one-story building in Fontanelle, Nebraska. It was built with bricks under the supervision of H.J. Carpenter in 1896. Inside, there are polling booths, and "wooden tongue-in-groove wainscotting [...] on all four walls." It has been listed on the National Register of Historic Places since September 9, 1982.

References

National Register of Historic Places in Washington County, Nebraska
Government buildings completed in 1896